Public higher education in Mexico is the one that is taught after high school or equivalent (higher secondary education). It is carried out through higher education institutions (IES) of the public sector. The main degree taken by the majority of students is licenciatura (bachelor's degree), which is usually accredited between 4 and 5 years in minimum time for those who finish their studies. The degrees offered are técnico superior universitario (associate's degree), licenciatura (bachelor's degree), specialization, master's degree and doctorate. In addition, diploma courses and continuing education courses are offered.

Public higher education institutions

Universidades Públicas Estatales (State Public Universities)
They are institutions of higher education created by decree of local congresses, under the legal figure of decentralized public bodies. These state institutions develop the functions of teaching, generation and innovative application of knowledge, as well as the extension and dissemination of culture.
They include:

Universidad Autónoma de Aguascalientes
Universidad Autónoma de Baja California
Universidad Autónoma de Baja California Sur
Universidad Autónoma de Campeche
Universidad Autónoma del Carmen
Universidad Autónoma de Coahuila
Universidad de Colima
Universidad Autónoma de Chiapas
Universidad Autónoma de Chihuahua
Universidad Autónoma de Ciudad Juárez
Universidad Juárez del Estado de Durango
Universidad de Guanajuato
Universidad Autónoma de Guerrero
Universidad Autónoma del Estado de Hidalgo
Universidad de Guadalajara
Universidad Autónoma del Estado de México
Universidad Michoacana de San Nicolás de Hidalgo
Universidad Autónoma del Estado de Morelos
Universidad Autónoma de Nayarit
Universidad Autónoma de Nuevo León
Universidad Autónoma Benito Juárez de Oaxaca
Benemérita Universidad Autónoma de Puebla
Universidad Autónoma de Querétaro
Universidad de Quintana Roo
Universidad Autónoma de San Luis Potosí
Universidad Autónoma de Sinaloa
Universidad de Sonora
Instituto Tecnológico de Sonora
Universidad Juárez Autónoma de Tabasco
Universidad Autónoma de Tamaulipas
Universidad Autónoma de Tlaxcala
Universidad Veracruzana
Universidad Autónoma de Yucatán
Universidad Autónoma de Zacatecas

Universidades Politécnicas (Polytechnical Universities)

They are an educational project created in 2001 to offer engineering careers, undergraduate and postgraduate studies at the specialty level. Its programs are designed based on the Competency-Based Educational Model and are oriented in applied research to technological development.
They include:

Universidad Politécnica de Aguascalientes
Universidad Politécnica de Baja California
Universidad Politécnica de Chiapas
Universidad Politécnica de Tapachula
Universidad Politécnica de Chihuahua
Universidad Politécnica de Piedras Negras
Universidad Politécnica de Ramos Arizpe
Universidad Politécnica Cuencamé
Universidad Politécnica de Durango
Universidad Politécnica de Gómez Palacio
Universidad Politécnica de Tecámac
Universidad Politécnica de Texcoco
Universidad Politécnica del Valle de México
Universidad Politécnica del Valle de Toluca
Universidad Politécnica de Guanajuato
Universidad Politécnica Juventino Rosas
Universidad Politécnica de Pénjamo
Universidad Politécnica del Bicentenario
Universidad Politécnica del Estado de Guerrero
Universidad Politécnica de Francisco I. Madero
Universidad Politécnica de Huejutla
Universidad Politécnica Metropolitana de Hidalgo
Universidad Politécnica de Pachuca
Universidad Politécnica de Tulancingo
Universidad Politécnica de la Zona Metropolitana de Guadalajara
Universidad Politécnica de Lázaro Cárdenas
Universidad Politécnica de Uruapan
Universidad Politécnica del Estado Morelos
Universidad Politécnica de Apodaca
Universidad Politécnica de Amozoc
Universidad Politécnica Metropolitana de Puebla
Universidad Politécnica de Puebla
Universidad Politécnica de Querétaro
Universidad Politécnica de Santa Rosa Jáuregui
Universidad Politécnica de Bacalar
Universidad Politécnica de Quintana Roo
Universidad Politécnica de San Luis Potosí
Universidad Politécnica del Mar y la Sierra
Universidad Politécnica de Sinaloa
Universidad Politécnica del Valle de Évora
Universidad Politécnica del Centro
Universidad Politécnica del Golfo de México
Universidad Politécnica Mesoamericana
Universidad Politécnica de Altamira
Universidad Politécnica de la Región Ribereña
Universidad Politécnica de Victoria
Universidad Politécnica de Tlaxcala Región Poniente
Universidad Politécnica de Tlaxcala
Universidad Politécnica de Huatusco
Universidad Politécnica del Sur de Zacatecas
Universidad Politécnica de Zacatecas

References

Higher education in Mexico